This is a list of all National Register of Historic Places listings in the Town of Hempstead in Nassau County, New York.  The locations of National Register properties for which the latitude and longitude coordinates are included below, may be seen in an online map.

Listings

|}

See also
National Register of Historic Places listings in New York
National Register of Historic Places listings in Nassau County, New York

References

Hempstead, New York